The Buena Regional School District is a comprehensive regional public school district serving students in pre-kindergarten through twelfth grade from Buena Borough and Buena Vista Township, two municipalities in Atlantic County, New Jersey, United States. Students are sent to the district's high school for grades 9 - 12 from both Estell Manor City and Weymouth Township as part of sending/receiving relationships with the respective school districts.

As of the 2020–21 school year, the district, comprised of five schools, had an enrollment of 1,691 students and 150.0 classroom teachers (on an FTE basis), for a student–teacher ratio of 11.3:1.

The district is classified by the New Jersey Department of Education as being in District Factor Group "A", the lowest of eight groupings. District Factor Groups organize districts statewide to allow comparison by common socioeconomic characteristics of the local districts. From lowest socioeconomic status to highest, the categories are A, B, CD, DE, FG, GH, I and J.

History 
In June 2009, the New Jersey Department of Education ruled that Newfield, a non-operating district seeking to cut costs for its tuition students, could end its relationship with the Buena Regional School District and as of the 2011–12 school year could start sending incoming high school students in grades 7–9 to Delsea Regional High School, under a transition in which students at Buena's high school would remain in the district until they graduated.

Schools 
Schools in the district (with 2020–21 enrollment data from the National Center for Education Statistics) are:

Elementary schools
Collings Lakes Elementary School with 197 students in grades K-2
Richard A. Lawrence, Principal
John C. Milanesi Elementary School with 259 students in grades PreK-2
Moses White, Principal
Dr. J.P. Cleary Elementary School with 309 students in grades 3-5
Dr. Leonard Long, Principal
Middle school
Buena Regional Middle School with 336 students in grades 6-8
Karen Cavalieri, Principal
Sean Dallas, Vice Principal
High school
Buena Regional High School with 535 students in grades 9-12
Christina Collazo-Franco, Principal

Administration
Core members of the district's administration are:
David Cappuccio Jr., Superintendent
Pasquale Yacovelli, Business Administrator / Board Secretary

Board of education
The district's board of education is comprised of nine members who set policy and oversee the fiscal and educational operation of the district through its administration. As a Type II school district, the board's trustees are elected directly by voters to serve three-year terms of office on a staggered basis, with three seats up for election each year held (since 2012) as part of the November general election. The board appoints a superintendent to oversee the district's day-to-day operations and a business administrator to supervise the business functions of the district. Seats on the board of education are allocated based on population, with six assigned to Buena Vista Township and three to Buena Borough.

References

External links
Buena Regional School District NJ

Data for the Buena Regional School District, National Center for Education Statistics

Buena, New Jersey
Buena Vista Township, New Jersey
New Jersey District Factor Group A
School districts in Atlantic County, New Jersey
Weymouth Township, New Jersey